Lars Edström (born 10 July 1935) is a Swedish actor. He has appeared in 24 films and television shows between 1959 and 2002.

Selected filmography
 Ormen (1966)
 Mästerdetektiven Blomkvist på nya äventyr (1966)
 Elvis! Elvis! (1976)

References

External links

1935 births
Living people
20th-century Swedish male actors
21st-century Swedish male actors
Swedish male film actors
Swedish male television actors
Male actors from Stockholm